Gnathoncus is a genus of clown beetles in the family Histeridae. There are more than 20 described species in Gnathoncus.

Species
These 28 species belong to the genus Gnathoncus:

 Gnathoncus baeckmanni Reichardt, 1941
 Gnathoncus barbatus Bousquet & Laplante, 1999
 Gnathoncus brevisetosus Bousquet & Laplante, 2006
 Gnathoncus brevisternus Lewis, 1907
 Gnathoncus buyssoni Auzat, 1917
 Gnathoncus cavicola Normand, 1949
 Gnathoncus cerberus Auzat, 1923
 Gnathoncus communis (Marseul, 1862)
 Gnathoncus disjunctus Solskiy, 1876
 Gnathoncus ibericus Yélamos, 1992
 Gnathoncus interceptus (J. L. LeConte, 1851)
 Gnathoncus kiritshenkoi Reichardt, 1930
 Gnathoncus moradii Vienna & Ratto, 2013
 Gnathoncus nannetensis (Marseul, 1862)
 Gnathoncus nidorum Stockmann, 1957
 Gnathoncus ovulatus Casey
 Gnathoncus potanini Reitter, 1896
 Gnathoncus procerulus (Erichson, 1834)
 Gnathoncus punctator Reitter, 1896
 Gnathoncus pygmaeus Kryzhanovskij in Kryzhanovskij & Reichardt, 1976
 Gnathoncus rhodiorum (Marseul, 1862)
 Gnathoncus rossi Hatch, 1962
 Gnathoncus rotundatus (Kugelann, 1792)
 Gnathoncus semimarginatus Bickhardt, 1920
 Gnathoncus turkmenicus Olexa, 1992
 Gnathoncus umbrettarum Thérond, 1952
 Gnathoncus vietnamicus Kryzhanovskij, 1972
 Gnathoncus wassilieffi Normand, 1935

References

Further reading

External links

 

Histeridae
Articles created by Qbugbot